The Fair Maid of Perth is a 1923 British silent adventure film directed by Edwin Greenwood and starring Russell Thorndike, Sylvia Caine and Lionel d'Aragon. It was made at Beaconsfield Studios, and based on the 1828 novel The Fair Maid of Perth by Sir Walter Scott.

Cast
 Russell Thorndike as Dwining 
 Sylvia Caine as Catherine 
 Lionel d'Aragon as Black Douglas 
 Tristan Rawson as Harry Gow 
 Charles Barratt  
 Lionelle Howard  
 Donald Macardle
 Sidney Paxton
 Wallace Bosco   
 Jack Denton 
 Leal Douglas
 Kate Gurney

References

Bibliography
 Low, Rachael. History of the British Film, 1918-1929. George Allen & Unwin, 1971.

1923 films
1920s historical adventure films
British historical adventure films
British silent feature films
Films set in Scotland
Films set in the 15th century
Films shot at Beaconsfield Studios
Films directed by Edwin Greenwood
Films based on works by Walter Scott
Films based on British novels
British black-and-white films
1920s English-language films
1920s British films
Silent historical adventure films